Ministry of Foreign and European Affairs may refer to the following Foreign Ministries:
  Federal Ministry for European and International Affairs (Austria)
  Ministry of Foreign and European Affairs (Croatia)
  Ministry of Foreign and European Affairs (France)
  Ministry of Foreign Affairs and European Integration (Moldova)

It may also refer to the foreign ministry of the European Union:
  European External Action Service

Or any European foreign ministry:
  Ministry of Foreign Affairs (Albania)
  Ministry of External Affairs (Andorra)
  Ministry of Foreign Affairs (Armenia)
  Ministry of Foreign Affairs (Azerbaijan)
  Ministry of Foreign Affairs (Belarus)
  Federal Public Service Foreign Affairs (Belgium)
  Ministry of Foreign Affairs (Bosnia and Herzegovina)
  Ministry of Foreign Affairs (Bulgaria)
  Ministry of Foreign Affairs (Cyprus)
  Ministry of Foreign Affairs (Czech Republic)
  Ministry of Foreign Affairs (Denmark)
  Ministry of Foreign Affairs (Estonia)
  Ministry for Foreign Affairs (Finland)
  Ministry of Foreign Affairs (Georgia)
  Foreign Office (Germany)
  Ministry of Foreign Affairs (Greece)
  Ministry of Foreign Affairs (Hungary)
  Ministry for Foreign Affairs (Iceland)
  Department of Foreign Affairs (Ireland)
  Ministry of Foreign Affairs (Italy)
  Ministry of Foreign Affairs (Kosovo)
  Ministry of Foreign Affairs (Latvia)
  Ministry of Foreign Affairs (Lithuania)
  Ministry of Foreign Affairs (Luxembourg)
  Ministry of Foreign Affairs (Malta)
  Department of External Relations (Monaco)
  Ministry of Foreign Affairs (Montenegro)
  Ministry of Foreign Affairs (Nagorno-Karabakh)
  Ministry of Foreign Affairs (Netherlands)
  Ministry of Foreign Affairs (Norway)
  Ministry of Foreign Affairs (Poland)
  Ministry of Foreign Affairs (Portugal)
  Ministry of Foreign Affairs (Romania)
  Ministry of Foreign Affairs (Russia)
  Ministry of Foreign Affairs (Serbia)
  Ministry of Foreign Affairs (Slovakia)
  Ministry of Foreign Affairs (Slovenia)
  Ministry of Foreign Affairs and Cooperation (Spain)
  Ministry for Foreign Affairs (Sweden)
  Federal Department of Foreign Affairs (Switzerland)
  Ministry of Foreign Affairs (Turkey)
  Ministry of Foreign Affairs (Ukraine)
  Foreign and Commonwealth Office (United Kingdom)
  Secretariat of State (Holy See) (Vatican City)